Melusine is a 1944 German drama film directed by Hans Steinhoff and starring Olga Chekhova, Siegfried Breuer and Angelika Hauff.

The film's sets were designed by the art director Kurt Herlth and Robert Herlth. It was partly shot on location around Lake Wolfgang in Austria.

Cast
Olga Chekhova as Nora
Siegfried Breuer as Stefan Brock
Angelika Hauff as Christine von Hardegg
Friedrich Domin as Professor von Hardegg
Lisa Siebel as Melitta Meyesenburg
Franz Pfaudler as Praxmaier, Juwelier
Hans Adalbert Schlettow as Keller, Chauffeur
Gretl Rainer as Anna Zelch
Wastl Witt as Martin Zelch
Hans Alpassy as Michael Haider
Hans Kratzer as Hufnagl, postman
Herbert Gernot as Dr. Perotti

See also
Überläufer

References

External links

Films of Nazi Germany
German drama films
1944 drama films
Films directed by Hans Steinhoff
German films based on plays
Terra Film films
Films shot in Austria
German black-and-white films
1940s German films
1940s German-language films